The mountain honeyeater (Microptilotis orientalis), hill-forest honeyeater or mountain meliphaga, is a species of bird in the family Meliphagidae. 
It is found throughout New Guinea.
Its natural habitats are subtropical or tropical moist lowland forest and subtropical or tropical moist montane forest.

References

External links
ITIS report: Meliphaga orientalis.

mountain honeyeater
Birds of New Guinea
mountain honeyeater
Taxonomy articles created by Polbot